Akhunovo (Axun) is a rural locality (a selo) and the administrative centre of Akhunovsky Selsoviet, Uchalinsky District, Bashkortostan, Russia. The population was 2,449 as of 2010. There are 55 streets.

Geography 
Akhunovo is located 25 km southeast of Uchaly (the district's administrative centre) by road. Kidysh is the nearest rural locality.

References 

Rural localities in Uchalinsky District